Guilielmofloweria is an extinct genus of proterotheriid litoptern that lived from the Middle to Late Eocene of what is now Argentina. Fossils have been found in the Sarmiento Formation of Argentina.

Taxonomy 
Guilielmofloweria was first named in 1901 by Florentino Ameghino based on fragmentary remains found in the Sarmiento Formation of Argentina, in rocks dating back to the Middle Eocene. He originally considered it a member of the pantodont family Pantolambdidae, but recent studies have shown this to be incorrect, as Richard Cifelli considered it as a member of the litoptern family Proterotheriidae, more specifically within the subfamily Anisolambdinae. Anisolambdinae (also called Anisolambdidae in some studies) was proposed to unite the primitive and earlier forms Anisolambda, Eolicaphrium, Heteroglyphis, Lambdaconops, Paranisolambda, Protheosodon, Wainka and Xesmodon. However, the phylogenetic analysis of McGrath and colleagues recovered the included genera to neither form their own clade, or to universally represent basal taxa outside the genera of Proterotheriinae per Soria, making Anisolambdinae a polyphyletic group of unrelated organisms.

References 

Proterotheriids
Prehistoric placental genera
Eocene mammals of South America
Divisaderan
Mustersan
Paleogene Argentina
Fossils of Argentina
Fossil taxa described in 1901
Taxa named by Florentino Ameghino
Golfo San Jorge Basin
Sarmiento Formation